Chisasibi (meaning Great River) is a village on the eastern shore of James Bay, in the Eeyou Istchee equivalent territory (ET) in northern Quebec, Canada. Chisasibi is one of nine Cree villages in the region, and is a member of the Grand Council of the Crees of Quebec. The territory surrounding Chisasibi is part of the Eeyou Istchee James Bay Territory, of which parts are jointly managed by the municipalities of the Jamésie TE and the Cree Regional Authority of the Eeyou Istchee TE.

History
The Cree have lived in the region for many centuries but were nomadic. In 1803, the Hudson's Bay Company founded Fort George, a trading post on the north shore which was relocated to the largest island at the mouth of La Grande River in 1837. Fort George became a permanent village as the local Cree population abandoned their nomadic way of life in the early 20th century and settled nearby. In 1940, its population was about 750 and grew to almost 2,000 in 1980.

In the mid-1970s, the construction of the James Bay hydro-electric project began, diverting upstream rivers into the La Grande watershed, increasing its flow significantly, resulting in erosion of Fort George Island (also called Governor's Island) and disruption to the formation of a solid ice cover in winter. In response, the Quebec Government built a new community on the mainland's south shore, relocating the population and some 200 houses to the new site in 1981. The village was renamed Chisasibi (official name: Cree Nation of Chisasibi). At the same time, the Fort George Relocation Corporation was formed to oversee the relocation.

The Cree Nation of Chisasibi

Chisasibi is the northern Cree village accessible by road and the northernmost community with year-round road access in eastern North America. A  paved road, running from Radisson, and parallel to the Grand River, connects Chisasibi to the James Bay Road (French: Route de la Baie James). The James Bay Road (formerly part of Route 109) was built from 1971 to 1974 as part of the James Bay hydroelectric project and connects Matagami to Radisson. Chisasibi Airport is located just west of the village and Air Creebec operates scheduled service from this airport. Though this is the most northern village, this is not where the road ends. From LG-1 (La Grande-1 generating station), the road continues north to a location called Longue Pointe (Long Point). It is the farthest one can go by road east of the Hudson Bay.

Many Cree in Chisasibi engage in hunting, trapping, and fishing activities, but all catch is for local consumption. Other economic activity includes local services (health care and education), employment by Hydro-Québec and some hospitality services. An elected Chief, Deputy Chief, and Council help administer the Cree Nation of Chisasibi Office.

Demographics
The population of Chisasibi comprises approximately 5,000 Cree, about 250 Inuit, and 300 non-native people. Statistics Canada's 2021 Census shows a total population of 4,985. 2006 Census shows the median age of the population is 24.1 years old, the percentage of the population aged 15 and over is 66.2, and the total number of census families was 960.

Total private dwellings (excluding seasonal cottages): 1,056 (total: 1,281)

Languages
Cree and Inuit are spoken as the first language in Chisasibi, in addition to English, as a primary language for official dealings.  Only 7.8% of the residents of Chisasibi speak one or both of the official languages as a mother tongue.  There has been criticism of the Quebec language policy with respect to native languages, particularly Cree, many related to Hydro-Québec's hydroelectric dam project in the James Bay region.

Mother tongues:
 Other as the first language (predominantly Cree): 92%
 English as the first language: 4%
 French as the first language: 3.5%
 English and French as the first language:<1 %

Education

The Cree School Board operates Waapinichikush Elementary School and the James Bay Eeyou School (JBES;), a high school. Eeyou opened in 1980. Previously the school provided boarding services for high school students for students from other villages of the James Bay region: Eastmain, Whapmagoostui, and Wemindji as at the time all high school classes in the region were in Chisasibi.  Eeyou has 398 students.

Climate
Chisasibi has a subarctic climate (Köppen Dfc), typical of the central latitudes of Quebec, with very cold and snowy winters and mild, rainy summers.

Image gallery

References

External links

Chisasibi Official Website
Grand Council of the Crees (of Quebec) (English, French, Cree)
Cree Culture
Cree Tourism
Ottertooth - Chisasibi page
First Nation Connectivity Profile
Chisasibi and Cree Links

Cree villages in Quebec
James Bay
Hudson's Bay Company trading posts
Eeyou Istchee (territory)